Rhythm of Destiny is a 1992 Hong Kong drama film directed by Andrew Lau, produced by and starring Danny Lee as a criminal who decides to retire and go straight. However, during an attempt to help his younger brother's (Aaron Kwok) singing career, he gets framed and convicted once again.

Plot
Lee Ka-yin (Danny Lee), nicknamed Bee, a diamond smuggler and former triad member and ex-con who have been imprisoned four times in the past, arrives in Taiwan for a business deal with Taiwanese triad leader, Hark (Blackie Ko). During the trade, Hark suggests Bee to smuggle cocaine, which Bee refuses. When Hark takes it as a joke, Bee pulls a gun on Hark, while one of Hark's henchman attempt to attack Bee and his underling, Kwan (Felix Lok), but Bee slices Hark's henchman with a sword. After the trade, Bee tells Kwan he wants to go straight and leave his criminal life while Kwan also longs to return to Hong Kong after hiding in Taiwan for three years due to an assault charge. Bee returns to Hong Kong and also gives Kwan some cash to illegally enter Hong Kong from boat.

Bee's younger brother, Kevin (Aaron Kwok) is a college student studying music and dance and aspires to be a singer. When Bee returns home, Kevin is delighted to see him, but not so much by his mother (Lisa Chiao Chiao) because his criminal past and kicks him out of the house. Bee assures his mother he has left criminal life and they move into a 1,400 square feet condo he bought for his family.

Bee then reconnects with his lover Hung (Sharla Cheung), a pub hostess. There, he also reconnects with Kwan and Superman (Shing Fui-On). Hung suggest Bee to acquire a nightclub from an owner is ready to emigrate, which Superman appoints himself to be manager. Kevin also arrives at the pub where he works as a part-time singer and performs on stage but Bee gets in an argument with rowdy patrons for being too loud. Kevin attempts to break up the argument but was punched and Bee attacks the patrons aided by Kwan and Superman.

At school, Kevin is persuaded by his classmates to participate in a singing contest. There, he also witnesses classmate Donna (Lucy Liu) during a dance rehearsal and asks her out afterwards. Bee then meets with Uncle Kau (Wu Ma) to lend money for acquiring the nightclub mentioned to him by Hung. Bee also mortgages his condo to Kau for an extra funds.

Kevin auditions for the singing contest and gets chosen. Bee, Superman and Kwan march in to the office of Yip Hon-leung, one of the judges of the singing contest and attempt to bribe him for Kevin to win. Bee, Hung, Superman and Kwan arrive to the singing contest to support Kevin, who ends up losing. Hung, Superman and Kwan assaults Yip while Bee attempts to stop them and Kevin gets arrested for assault and bribery. Bee admits to the charges to the police and gets convicted while Kevin is freed. Officer Wong (Parkman Wong) orders his subordinates to raid Bee's nightclub and finds a bag of cocaine hidden in his office by Kwan and Bee is also charged with drug possession which causes his mother to faint in court. She eventually dies in the hospital and Bee pleads with Officer Wong to allow him to attend his mother's funeral, where Kevin blames him for the death of their mother. Afterwards, Bee pleads guilty to his crimes and is sentenced to a combined term of 2 years and 9 months of imprisonment while his condo is also seized by the court.

During this depressing moment for Kevin, he is approached with s contract by record producer Peter Lai, who was one of the judges of the singing contest. Kevin's singing career takes off during Bee's time in prison and Hung visits him with a photo book of Kevin. After his release, Bee reunites with Hung and Superman, who has become a cleaner due to huge indebts. Bee and Hung attempt to visit Kevin in a birthday party with his fans, but Lai stops them in order to not affect his career and Bee leaves a gift of a necklace of a Christian cross. When Lai  hands it to Kevin, he rushed out to see his brother who had left. Later, Hung gives Bee a ticket to Kevin's upcoming concert held in Taiwan.

Meanwhile, Kwan, who is hiding in Taiwan for framing Bee, owes a huge debt to Hark. As Hark is about to chop his fingers off, Kwan then suggests Hark to kidnap Kevin in order to clear his debts. Bee attends Kevin's concert in Taiwan where his final song is dedicated to his brother. Kevin spots Bee at the audience when he throws a coin on stage. Afterwards, Bee goes backstage to see his brother and sees Kwan kidnapping Kevin. Bee saves his brother and kills Kwan with s samurai sword before Hark arrives and stabs Bee. Kevin then kills Hark and his henchmen and Bee dies in Kevin's arms.

Cast
Danny Lee as Lee Ka-yin (李嘉賢) / Bee (阿B)
Aaron Kwok as Kevin Lee (李嘉華) / Dee (阿Dee)
Sharla Cheung as Hung (阿紅)
Shing Fui-On as Superman (超人)
Wu Ma as Uncle Kau (九叔)
Blackie Ko as Hark (克哥)
Lisa Chiao Chiao as Bee and Kevin's mother
Felix Lok as Chan Kwan (陳坤)
Lucy Liu as Donna
Peter Lai as himself
Yip Hon-leung as himself
Parkman Wong as Officer Wong (王Sir)
James Ha as Hark's thug
Chan Chi-fai as Pub guest fighting Bee
Ricky Wong as Guest of Bee's nightclub
Lam Ching as himself
Yu Mo-lin as Madam Mui (梅姑)
Simon Lui as Contest emcee
Ng Kwok-kin as Leung
Jacky Cheung Chun-hung as Hark's thug
Lam Kwok-kit as Pub guest fighting Bee
Joe Chu as Pub guest fighting Bee
Diego Swing as Father Ko (高神父)
Philip Chan as himself
Law Shu-kei as Judge
Eric Kei as Policeman
John Wakefield as Attorney
Hung Yan-yan as Hark's thug
Kong Foo-keung as Hark's thug
King Kong Lam as Student
Cash Chin as Judicial officer 
Choi Kwok-keung as Thug
Yu Ming-hin as Policeman
Tam Kon-chung
Chu Tat-kwong
Dave Lam

Music

Production notes
Rhythm of Destiny featured the big-screen debut of American actress Lucy Liu.

Reception

Critical reception
Rhythm of Destiny earned a score of 6.9/10 stars on the Chinese media rating site, Douban.

Box office
The film grossed a total of HK$7,775,386 at the Hong Kong box office during its theatrical run from 2 to 25 April 1992.

See also
Aaron Kwok filmography

References

External links
Rhythm of Destiny at Hong Kong Cinemagic

1992 films
1992 drama films
Hong Kong drama films
Hong Kong gangster films
Triad films
1990s Cantonese-language films
Films directed by Andrew Lau
Films about brothers
Films about criminals
Films about singers
Films set in Hong Kong
Films shot in Hong Kong
Films set in Taiwan
Films shot in Taiwan
1990s Hong Kong films